may refer to:
 A title used in traditional Japanese arts such as Noh, kabuki, and 
 , the highest class of courtesan in Japan.

See also
 Tayu (disambiguation)